Charles Dean is an American former Negro league catcher who played in the 1940s.

Dean played for the Atlanta Black Crackers and the New York Black Yankees in 1943. In three recorded games, he posted one hit in 11 plate appearances.

References

External links
 and Seamheads

Year of birth missing
Place of birth missing
Atlanta Black Crackers players
New York Black Yankees players
Baseball catchers